Stathmonotus stahli, the eelgrass blenny or the seagrass blenny, is a species of chaenopsid blenny found in coral reefs in the western Atlantic ocean. It can reach a maximum length of  TL. The specific name honours the Puerto Rican physician and biologist Agustín Stahl (1842-1917).

References
 Evermann, B.W. and M.C. Marsh, 1899 (19 Dec.) Descriptions of new genera and species of fishes from Puerto Rico. Report of the United States Fish Commission v. 25 [1899]: 351–362.

stahli
Fish described in 1899